Ruth Buscombe (born 21 December 1989) is a British strategy engineer for the Alfa Romeo Racing Formula One team. A first class honours graduate of the University of Cambridge Department of Engineering, she began working in Formula One with Scuderia Ferrari at its headquarters in 2012 as a race strategist. Buscombe later moved to Haas in November 2015 to become the team's strategy engineer. She left Haas in June 2016 and was employed by Sauber three months later, helping the team to finish ahead of rival Manor Racing in the 2016 Constructors' Championship. Buscombe is an ambassador for Dare to be Different.

Biography

Early life and education
In an interview with The Guardian in 2017, Buscombe describes her childhood as going from "wanting to be a princess, to being an astronaut to wanting to be in F1", having become interested in motor racing at age 11. She cited Formula One engineers James Allison and Paddy Lowe as her inspiration. She was educated at Forest School, Walthamstow, enjoying mathematics and the problem solving aspect of the subject. Buscombe's teachers attempted to discourage her from a career in engineering because they questioned why she wanted to work in a male-dominated industry. At age 18, she narrowly avoided being killed in a road accident. Buscombe went to the University of Cambridge Department of Engineering to study Aerospace and Aerothermal Engineering. Her master's thesis was on the effect of the drag reduction system and was conducted in conjunction with motorsport's governing body, the Fédération Internationale de l'Automobile, with supervision from former Jaguar team principal Tony Purnell. Buscombe graduated with a first class honours degree in 2012.

Career
Immediately after graduation, Buscombe entered Formula One with the Scuderia Ferrari team in 2012 as a simulation development engineer where she developed and implemented algorithms. She was promoted to the role of a race strategist in March 2013 and worked at Ferrari's headquarters in Maranello. Buscombe oversaw the strategic decisions for driver Felipe Massa and later Kimi Räikkönen from the factory's remote garage. She remained with Ferrari throughout 2015 before leaving at the end of the season to join first-year team Haas F1 in November as their strategy engineer. Buscombe was now working at the tracks and on the pitwall. She joined the Dare to be Different campaign in February 2016.

Buscombe's strategy allowed lead driver Romain Grosjean to claim two successive top six finishes in the season's first two races in Australia and Bahrain. Following speculation of a disagreement, she left Haas in June 2016. Following its purchase by Longbow Finance the following month, Sauber employed several new personnel as part of a recruitment drive with Buscombe being hired by the team in September and started her new job at the Malaysian Grand Prix. She formulated a strategy to allow Felipe Nasr to finish ninth in the Brazilian race, which saw Sauber overtake Manor Racing tenth in the Constructors' Championship.

References

Formula One engineers
British motorsport people
British women engineers
1989 births
Living people
People educated at Forest School, Walthamstow
Alumni of the University of Cambridge
21st-century women engineers
Ferrari people
Alfa Romeo people